Isaac H. Cairnes (died May 2, 1890) was an American politician from Maryland. He served as a member of the Maryland House of Delegates, representing Harford County from 1865 to 1866.

Career
Isaac H. Cairnes served as a member of the Maryland House of Delegates, representing Harford County from 1865 to 1866.

Personal life
Cairnes lived in Jarrettsville.

Cairnes died on May 2, 1890. He was buried at Bethel Presbyterian Church.

References

Year of birth unknown
1890 deaths
People from Jarrettsville, Maryland
Members of the Maryland House of Delegates
19th-century American politicians